Dennis Anthony Widdop (14 March 1931 – October 2016) was an English professional footballer who played as a winger.

Career
Born in Keighley, Widdop signed for Bradford City from Portadown in July 1954. He made 1 league appearance for the club, before being released in June 1955.

Sources

References

1931 births
2016 deaths
English footballers
Portadown F.C. players
Bradford City A.F.C. players
English Football League players
Association football wingers